The Cape Agulhas Lighthouse is situated at Cape Agulhas, the southernmost tip of Africa. It was the third lighthouse to be built in South Africa, and the second-oldest still operating, after Green Point. It is located on the southern edge of the village of L'Agulhas, in the Agulhas National Park; the light is operated by Transnet National Ports Authority. In 2016, the American Society of Civil Engineers (ASCE) identified the lighthouse as a deserving prominent historic engineering project and International Historic Civil Engineering Landmark.

History

A lighthouse at Cape Agulhas was suggested by Colonel Charles Collier Michell, the Surveyor-General of the Cape, in March 1837. A public meeting at Cape Town on 11 July 1840 resolved to raise funds for the construction of the lighthouse, and Michiel van Breda, the founder of Bredasdorp, offered to donate the land on which it was to be built. Apart from local contributions, funds were received from Bombay, Calcutta, Madras, Manila, St Helena and London; by June 1843 the sum raised was £1,479.3s.9d (£1,479.19).

In 1847, the government of the Cape Colony agreed to fund the construction at a cost of £15,871; building work began in April of that year and was completed in December 1848, and the light was first lit on 1 March 1849. Originally, it was fuelled by the tail-fat of sheep, but in 1905 an oil-burning lantern was installed. In March 1910, the lens was replaced with a first-order Fresnel lens. In 1929, the oil burner was replaced by a petroleum vapour burner, which was in turn replaced in 1936 by a four-kilowatt electric lamp powered by a diesel generator.

In 1968, the lighthouse was taken out of service, and the light moved to an aluminum tower, as it was discovered that the sandstone walls were crumbling due to excessive weathering. The building was declared a national monument in 1973 and is also a Western Cape provincial heritage site. Restoration and reconstruction was performed by the Bredasdorp Shipwreck Museum and the local council, and the lighthouse was recommissioned in 1988.

In 2016, the American Society of Civil Engineers (ASCE) identified the lighthouse as a deserving prominent historic engineering project and International Historic Civil Engineering Landmark.

Characteristics
The design of the building was inspired by the Pharos of Alexandria. The rotating optic gives off one white flash every five seconds. The lighthouse is 171 years old

See also

 List of lighthouses in South Africa
 List of heritage sites in South Africa
 List of Historic Civil Engineering Landmarks

References

Further reading

External links

 Transnet National Ports Authority: Cape Agulhas
 Agulhas National Park

1848 establishments in the Cape Colony
Buildings and structures in the Western Cape
Lighthouses completed in 1848
Lighthouses in South Africa
Monuments and memorials in South Africa
South African heritage sites
Tourist attractions in the Western Cape
Cape Agulhas Local Municipality
Historic Civil Engineering Landmarks